Torii (written : 鳥居) is a Japanese surname. Notable people with the surname include:

 Chiho Torii (born 1970), Japanese former volleyball player
 Hirofumi Torii (born 1988), Japanese figure skater
 Keiko Torii, Japanese plant scientist
 Torii Kiyohiro (died c. 1776), Japanese artist
 Torii Kiyomasu (fl. 1690s – 1720s), Japanese painter and printmaker
 Torii Kiyomasu II (c. 1720 - 1750), Japanese painter and woodblock printmaker
 Torii Kiyomitsu (1735 – 1785), Japanese painter and printmaker
 Torii Kiyomoto (1645 - 1702), Japanese actor
 Torii Kiyonaga (1752 – 1815), Japanese artist
 Torii Kiyonobu I (c. 1664 – 1729), Japanese painter and printmaker
 Torii Kiyonobu II (active 1725 - 1760), Japanese ukiyo-e artist
 Torii Kiyotsune (fl. mid-18th century), Japanese artist
 Torii Kotondo (1900 – 1976), Japanese artist
 Mitsuko Torii (born 1943), female Japanese high jump athlete
 Torii Mototada (1539 – 1600), Japanese samurai, who served Tokugawa Ieyasu
 Torii Naritsugu (1570 - 1631), Japanese lord and son of Torii Mototada
 Torii Ryūzō (1870 – 1953), Japanese anthropologist, ethnologist, archaeologist and folklorist
 Torii Suneemon (1540 – 1575), Japanese samurai and ashigaru
 Torii Tadafumi (1847 – 1914), Japanese samurai and daimyō
 Torii Tadaharu (1624 – 1663), Japanese daimyō
 Torii Tadamasa (1567 – 1628), Japanese daimyō
 Torii Tadanori (1646 – 1689), Japanese daimyō
 Torii Tadateru (1665 – 1716), Japanese daimyō
 Torii Tadatsune (1604 – 1636), Japanese daimyō and son of Torii Tadamasa
 Torii Tadayoshi (died 1571), Japanese samurai
 Tokutoshi Torii (born 1947), Japanese architect
 Tomoo Torii (born 1973), Japanese judoka
 Yoshimasa Torii (born 1942), male Japanese pole vault athlete

Japanese-language surnames